Osmosis is the spontaneous net movement or diffusion of solvent molecules through a selectively-permeable membrane from a region of high water potential (region of lower solute concentration) to a region of low water potential (region of higher solute concentration), in the direction that tends to equalize the solute concentrations on the two sides. It may also be used to describe a physical process in which any solvent moves across a selectively permeable membrane (permeable to the solvent, but not the solute) separating two solutions of different concentrations. Osmosis can be made to do work. Osmotic pressure is defined as the external pressure required to be applied so that there is no net movement of solvent across the membrane.  Osmotic pressure is a colligative property, meaning that the osmotic pressure depends on the molar concentration of the solute but not on its identity.

Osmosis is a vital process in biological systems, as biological membranes are semipermeable. In general, these membranes are impermeable to large and polar molecules, such as ions, proteins, and polysaccharides, while being permeable to non-polar or hydrophobic molecules like lipids as well as to small molecules like oxygen, carbon dioxide, nitrogen, and nitric oxide. Permeability depends on solubility, charge, or chemistry, as well as solute size. Water molecules travel through the plasma membrane, tonoplast membrane (vacuole) or organelle membranes by diffusing across the phospholipid bilayer via aquaporins (small transmembrane proteins similar to those responsible for facilitated diffusion and ion channels). Osmosis provides the primary means by which water is transported into and out of cells. The turgor pressure of a cell is largely maintained by osmosis across the cell membrane between the cell interior and its relatively hypotonic environment.

History

Some kinds of osmotic flow have been observed since ancient times, e.g., on the construction of Egyptian pyramids. Jean-Antoine Nollet first documented observation of osmosis in 1748. The word "osmosis" descends from the words "endosmose" and "exosmose", which were coined by French physician René Joachim Henri Dutrochet (1776–1847) from the Greek words ἔνδον (éndon "within"), ἔξω (éxō "outer, external"), and ὠσμός (ōsmós "push, impulsion"). In 1867, Moritz Traube invented highly selective precipitation membranes, advancing the art and technique of measurement of osmotic flow.

Description
Osmosis is the movement of a solvent across a semipermeable membrane toward a higher concentration of solute. In biological systems, the solvent is typically water, but osmosis can occur in other liquids, supercritical liquids, and even gases.

When a cell is submerged in water, the water molecules pass through the cell membrane from an area of low solute concentration to high solute concentration. For example, if the cell is submerged in saltwater, water molecules move out of the cell. If a cell is submerged in freshwater, water molecules move into the cell.  When the membrane has a volume of pure water on both sides, water molecules pass in and out in each direction at exactly the same rate. There is no net flow of water through the membrane.

Osmosis can be demonstrated when potato slices are added to a high salt solution. The water from inside the potato moves out to the solution, causing the potato to shrink and to lose its 'turgor pressure'. The more concentrated the salt solution, the bigger the loss in size and weight of the potato slice.

Chemical gardens demonstrate the effect of osmosis in inorganic chemistry.

Mechanism
The mechanism responsible for driving osmosis has commonly been represented in biology and chemistry texts as either the dilution of water by solute (resulting in lower concentration of water on the higher solute concentration side of the membrane and therefore a diffusion of water along a concentration gradient) or by a solute's attraction to water (resulting in less free water on the higher solute concentration side of the membrane and therefore net movement of water toward the solute). Both of these notions have been conclusively refuted.

The diffusion model of osmosis is rendered untenable by the fact that osmosis can drive water across a membrane toward a higher concentration of water. The "bound water"  model is refuted by the fact that osmosis is independent of the size of the solute molecules—a colligative property—or how hydrophilic they are.

It is difficult to describe osmosis without a mechanical or thermodynamic explanation, but essentially there is an interaction between the solute and water that counteracts the pressure that otherwise free solute molecules would exert. One fact to take note of is that heat from the surroundings is able to be converted into mechanical energy (water rising).

Many thermodynamic explanations go into the concept of chemical potential and how the function of the water on the solution side differs from that of pure water due to the higher pressure and the presence of the solute counteracting such that the chemical potential remains unchanged. The virial theorem demonstrates that attraction between the molecules (water and solute) reduces the pressure, and thus the pressure exerted by water molecules on each other in solution is less than in pure water, allowing pure water to "force" the solution until the pressure reaches equilibrium.

Role in living things

Osmotic pressure is the main agent of support in many plants. The osmotic entry of water raises the turgor pressure exerted against the cell wall, until it equals the osmotic pressure, creating a steady state.

When a plant cell is placed in a solution that is hypertonic relative to the cytoplasm, water moves out of the cell and the cell shrinks. In doing so, the cell becomes flaccid. In extreme cases, the cell becomes plasmolyzed – the cell membrane disengages with the cell wall due to lack of water pressure on it.

When a plant cell is placed in a solution that is hypotonic relative to the cytoplasm, water moves into the cell and the cell swells to become turgid.

Osmosis is responsible for the ability of plant roots to draw water from the soil. Plants concentrate solutes in their root cells by active transport, and water enters the roots by osmosis. Osmosis is also responsible for controlling the movement of guard cells.

In unusual environments, osmosis can be very harmful to organisms. For example, freshwater and saltwater aquarium fish placed in water of a different salinity than that to which they are adapted to will die quickly, and in the case of saltwater fish, dramatically. Another example of a harmful osmotic effect is the use of table salt to kill leeches and slugs.

Suppose an animal or a plant cell is placed in a solution of sugar or salt in water.
 If the medium is hypotonic relative to the cell cytoplasm,  the cell will gain water through osmosis.
 If the medium is isotonic, there will be no net movement of water across the cell membrane.
 If the medium is hypertonic relative to the cell cytoplasm, the cell will lose water by osmosis.

This means that if a cell is put in a solution which has a solute concentration higher than its own, it will shrivel, and if it is put in a solution with a lower solute concentration than its own, the cell will swell and may even burst.

Factors

Osmotic pressure

Osmosis may be opposed by increasing the pressure in the region of high solute concentration with respect to that in the low solute concentration region. The force per unit area, or pressure, required to prevent the passage of water (or any other high-liquidity solution) through a selectively permeable membrane and into a solution of greater concentration is equivalent to the osmotic pressure of the solution, or turgor. Osmotic pressure is a colligative property, meaning that the property depends on the concentration of the solute, but not on its content or chemical identity.

Osmotic gradient
The osmotic gradient is the difference in concentration between two solutions on either side of a semipermeable membrane, and is used to tell the difference in percentages of the concentration of a specific particle dissolved in a solution.

Usually the osmotic gradient is used while comparing solutions that have a semipermeable membrane between them allowing water to diffuse between the two solutions, toward the hypertonic solution (the solution with the higher concentration). Eventually, the force of the column of water on the hypertonic side of the semipermeable membrane will equal the force of diffusion on the hypotonic (the side with a lesser concentration) side, creating equilibrium. When equilibrium is reached, water continues to flow, but it flows both ways in equal amounts as well as force, therefore stabilizing the solution.

Variation

Reverse osmosis

Reverse osmosis is a separation process that uses pressure to force a solvent through a semi-permeable membrane that retains the solute on one side and allows the pure solvent to pass to the other side, forcing it from a region of high solute concentration through a membrane to a region of low solute concentration by applying a pressure in excess of the osmotic pressure.

Forward osmosis

Osmosis may be used directly to achieve separation of water from a solution containing unwanted solutes. A "draw" solution of higher osmotic pressure than the feed solution is used to induce a net flow of water through a semi-permeable membrane, such that the feed solution becomes concentrated as the draw solution becomes dilute. The diluted draw solution may then be used directly (as with an ingestible solute like glucose), or sent to a secondary separation process for the removal of the draw solute. This secondary separation can be more efficient than a reverse osmosis process would be alone, depending on the draw solute used and the feedwater treated. Forward osmosis is an area of ongoing research, focusing on applications in desalination, water purification, water treatment, food processing, and other areas of study.

See also

Brining
Homeostasis
Osmoregulation
Osmotic shock
Osmotic power
Plasmolysis
Reverse osmosis plant
Salinity gradient power
Water potential

References

External links

Osmosis simulation in Java
NetLogo Osmosis simulation for educational use
An Osmosis Experiment

Diffusion
Water technology
Membrane technology